David Schnur (April 9, 1882, in Baranów, German Empire – March 16, 1948, in New York City, US) was an Austrian tobacco entrepreneur.

Early life 
Schnur's parents were the merchant Markus Schnur (born 1820 in Tarnów; died 1900 in Tarnów) and Else, née Neumann, the daughter of a businessman from Pressburg. David lived mostly in Prussia from the age of about ten.

Career in the tobacco industry 
In 1903, Schnur held an executive position at the Karmitri-Zigarettenfabrik AG cigarette factory in Berlin, which had been founded in 1880. He became its majority shareholder. He acquired Hadges-Nessim-Zigarettenfabrik GmbH in Hamburg and a trust company.

During the First World War, Schnur was a member of the presidium of the procurement office for raw tobacco. Recruited by 1920 by the Reemtsma brothers, who had no knowledge of tobacco themselves but developed machines for cigarette production, Schur directed the purchase of tobacco and the composition of tobacco mixtures in return for a share of the profits. In 1921 he took a stake in Reemtsma Cigarettenfabriken, becoming a partner in the company and a member of Reetsma's board of directors.

Schnur traveled frequently to the tobacco-growing areas in the Balkans. In 1923, he purchased a crop in Thessaloniki. Hans Domizlaff called the new cigarette Harvest 23.

Reemtsma moved its headquarters to Hamburg in 1922 attracted by the advantages of the free port. In 1924, Karmitri was merged with Reemtsma. During his travels, Schnur established contacts in government circles and became Turkish consul in Berlin. In 1929, the University Braunschweig awarded him an honorary doctorate. Until Hitler came to power, Schnur headed Reetsma's tobacco growing interests.

His son , born in Berlin in 1907, received German citizenship in 1920.

Nazi-era persecution and exile 
Following complaints by Hitler's SA that Reemtsma was producing Jewish cigarettes, expatriation proceedings were initiated against him in 1935. Schnur escaped a raid by the Gestapo in early July and emigrated to the US via France in 1939. In the US, he acquired American citizenship and died in the US in 1948.

See also 
Reetsma

History of tobacco

Hans Domizlaf

The Holocaust in Austria

References

Further reading 
 
 Schnur, David, in: Joseph Walk (Hrsg.): Kurzbiographien zur Geschichte der Juden 1918–1945. München : Saur, 1988, ISBN 3-598-10477-4, S. 332
 Schnur, David, in: Werner Röder, Herbert A. Strauss (Hrsg.): Biographisches Handbuch der deutschsprachigen Emigration nach 1933. Band 1: Politik, Wirtschaft, Öffentliches Leben. München : Saur, 1980, S. 659f.

1948 deaths
1882 births
Austrian emigrants to the United States
Emigrants from Nazi Germany
Honorary consuls
20th-century Austrian businesspeople
Businesspeople from Berlin
Jews who emigrated to escape Nazism